Peter Davies (born 1970, Edinburgh, Scotland) is an artist based in London.

Davies ' at the Royal Academy of Art in London, Centro Brasileiro Britanico in Sao Paulo, Saatchi Gallery in London, Kunsthallen Brandts Klaedefabrik in Denmark and ICA in London. Davies won the John Moores Painting Prize in 2002.

His work is held in the collection of the Tate Gallery.

References

External links
Peter Davies on ArtFacts.Net

Living people
1970 births
Artists from Edinburgh
Scottish contemporary artists